Courtney William Alymer Thomas Kenny  (25 December 1835 – 12 December 1905) was a 19th-century Member of Parliament from the Marlborough Region, New Zealand.

Courtenay and his wife (Georgina Paulina Edith Kenny, 1835–1899,) are reported to have arrived in Port Nicholson on the 'Philip Laing' 23 December 1856  and to have established and named the 'Lochmara Run' in Queen Charlotte Sound / Tōtaranui, centred on Double Cove and what was to become Lochmara Bay in 1857.  They later farmed ‘The Rocks’ in Double Cove, until their deaths.

Courtenay Kenny is reported to have been born in India, probably Moulmein (now in Burma), to an Indian army officer.  His wife was born in Geilston, Dumbarton, Scotland, also to an Indian army father.   Both were educated in England.

Kenny, having risen from ensign to captain in the 88th (Connaught Rangers) Regiment of Foot, served in Crimea and then exchanged to the 94th (Scotch) Regiment.  He was founding Captain of the Marlborough Volunteers 1860-1 and Marlborough Commissioner of Crown Lands 1862–1866, then represented the Picton electorate from an 1866 by-election till 1881, when he retired.  He was appointed to the New Zealand Legislative Council on 15 May 1885 and served until his death on 12 December 1905.

References

1835 births
1905 deaths
New Zealand MPs for South Island electorates
Members of the New Zealand Legislative Council
Members of the New Zealand House of Representatives
People from Picton, New Zealand
19th-century New Zealand politicians
People from Mawlamyine